The Nomura Cup, also known as the Asia-Pacific Amateur Golf Team Championship, is a biennial amateur team golf championship for men organised by the Asia-Pacific Golf Confederation. The inaugural event was held in 1963 and it has been played in odd-numbered years since.

Format
Teams used to consist of four players but from 2022 the playing members have been reduced to three. The tournament is held over 4 days with 18 holes of stroke play on each day, the best two rounds counting for the team score.

History
In the early tournaments, only the Philippines, Japan and Chinese Taipei competed. By the eighth championship in 1977, held in Malaysia, a then record of 10 nations were competing. Australia, New Zealand and Papua New Guinea were invited beginning with the 1979 tournament. Only Australia, Japan and Chinese Taipei have won multiple times. South Korea, New Zealand and India have won as hosts. Thailand took an early lead at the 2017 tournament and managed to secure a maiden win. The 2019 edition scheduled for Hong Kong was postponed due to security concerns.

Results

Source:

Results summarySource:

See also
Eisenhower Trophy – biennial world amateur team golf championship for men organized by the International Golf Federation

References

External links
Nomura Cup: Full results

Amateur golf tournaments
Team golf tournaments
Golf tournaments in Asia
Recurring sporting events established in 1963